Bombus breviceps is a species of bumblebee.

This species is a main pollinator of black cardamom (Amomum subulatum) crops in India. Queen B. breviceps bees begin to found new colonies in late March, whereas worker bees forage from early May until mid-December.
The Bombus breviceps are able to use their small body size to fit in the flower and extract pollen that they then carry in their thorax and distribute to different plants and crops to contribute to cross- pollination.

References

Bumblebees
Insects described in 1852